The United States District Court for the Central District of Illinois (in case citations, C.D. Ill.) serves the residents of forty-six counties, which are divided into four divisions. The counties are: Adams, Brown, Bureau, Cass, Champaign, Christian, Coles, DeWitt, Douglas, Edgar, Ford, Fulton, Greene, Hancock, Henderson, Henry, Iroquois, Kankakee, Knox, Livingston, Logan, McDonough, McLean, Macoupin, Macon, Marshall, Mason, Menard, Mercer, Montgomery, Morgan, Moultrie, Peoria, Piatt, Pike, Putnam, Rock Island, Sangamon, Schuyler, Scott, Shelby, Stark, Tazewell, Vermilion, Warren, and Woodford counties.

The courthouses for the Central District's four divisions are in Peoria, Rock Island, Springfield, and Urbana.  In 2018, all court operations for the Rock Island District were moved to the federal courthouse in Davenport, Iowa, due to uninhabitable conditions at the Rock Island courthouse.

Appeals are taken to the United States Court of Appeals for the Seventh Circuit (except for patent claims and claims against the U.S. government under the Tucker Act, which are appealed to the Federal Circuit).

, the United States Attorney is Gregory K. Harris.

History
The United States District Court for the District of Illinois was established by a statute passed by the United States Congress on March 3, 1819, 3 Stat. 502. The act established a single office for a judge to preside over the court. Initially, the court was not within any existing judicial circuit, and appeals from the court were taken directly to the United States Supreme Court. In 1837, Congress created the United States Court of Appeals for the Seventh Circuit, placing it in Chicago, Illinois and giving it jurisdiction over the District of Illinois, .

It was later eliminated in a reorganization on October 2, 1978 which replaced it with the United States District Court for the Central District of Illinois District, . The newly created Central District was formed primarily from parts of the Southern District, and returned some counties to the Northern District. Some judges from both the Eastern and Southern Districts were transferred to the Central District by operation of law.

Current judges
:

Former judges

Chief judges

Succession of seats

See also 
 Courts of Illinois
 List of current United States district judges
 List of United States federal courthouses in Illinois

References

External links
United States District Court for the Central District of Illinois
Directory of Judges
General Services Administration pages about buildings:
 Peoria Federal Building and U.S. Courthouse
 Paul Findley Federal Building & U.S. Courthouse in Springfield
 U.S. Courthouse, Urbana

Illinois
Illinois law
Peoria, Illinois
Rock Island, Illinois
Springfield, Illinois
Urbana, Illinois
Courthouses in Illinois
1979 establishments in Illinois
Courts and tribunals established in 1979